is a 2014 Japanese tokusatsu comedy film directed by Yūichi Fukuda. It was released on 7 June 2014.

Cast
Mirei Kiritani as Naoko Akagi/Jossy Red
Mina Fujii as Mika Aota, Jossy Blue
Mitsuki Takahata as Yuri Kikawada, Jossy Yellow
Kasumi Arimura as Kanoko Midoriyama, Jossy Green
Mizuki Yamamoto as Sumire Konno, Jossy Navy

References

External links
 

2014 comedy films
Films directed by Yūichi Fukuda
Japanese comedy films
Tokusatsu films
2014 films
2010s Japanese films